The Federal College of Education (Technical), Potiskum is a federal government higher education institution located in Potiskum, Yobe State, Nigeria. It was first affiliated to Federal University of Technology Minna then substituted to Abubakar Tafawa Balewa University for its degree programmes. The college started offering PGDE programmes in 2021. The current Provost of the college is Dr. Muhammad Madu Yunusa.

History 
The Federal College of Education (Technical), Potiskum was established in 1991. It was originally known as Federal Advanced Teachers’ College (FATC), Yola.

Schools 
The college has the following schools under which exists various departments:
 School of Science Education
 School of Technical Education
 School of Business Education
 School of Vocational Education
 School of Education

Departments 
School of Science Education
 Chemistry Complex 
 Physics Complex
 Mathematics Complex
 Biology Complex
 Integrated Science Complex

School of Vocational Education
 Agricultural Science Complex
 Home Economics Complex
 Fine and Applied Art Complex

School of Technical Education
 Electrical Complex
 Automobile Complex
 Building Complex
 Woodwork Complex
 Metalwork Complex

School of Business Education
 Secretarial Complex
 Accounting Complex

School of Education
 Primary Education Complex
 Early Childhood Education Complex

Courses 
The institution offers the following courses;

 Education and physics
 Building technology education
 Woodwork technology education
 Education and integrated science
 Integrated science/physics
 Education and computer science
 Education and mathematics
 Home economics
 Computer education/chemistry
 Chemistry/integrated science
 Computer education/physics
 Electrical/electronics education
 Automobile technology education
 Education and chemistry
 Biology/integrated science
 Agricultural science and education
 Education and biology
 Business education
 Computer education/biology
 Computer science education/mathematics
 Agricultural science
 Early childhood care education
 Technical education
 Fine and applied arts
 Primary education studies
 Computer science/biology
 Metalwork technology education

Affiliation 
The institution is affiliated with the Abubakar Tafawa Balewa University to offer programmes leading to Bachelor of Education, (B.Ed.) in;

 Education & mathematics
 Metal work technology education
 Education and biology
 Wood work/education
 Automobile technology education
 Electrical/electronics education
 Education and chemistry
 Education & computer science
 Education & physics
 Building education
 Agricultural science and education

See also
 List of tertiary institutions in Yobe State

References 

Federal colleges of education in Nigeria
1991 establishments in Nigeria
Educational institutions established in 1991
Yobe State